Liga Meuhedet (lit. Special League) was a temporary second division of Israeli football in the 1949–50 season, the first after Israeli independence. It consisted of five regional division; North, Samaria, Sharon, Tel Aviv, Jerusalem and South. There was no promotion or relegation.

There was no league football during the 1950–51 season, and when it resumed in 1951–52, Liga Bet returned as the second tier with the same composition as the aborted 1947–48 Liga Bet, with the top teams from Samaria, Tel Aviv and Jerusalem-South divisions replacing inactive teams.

North Division

Samaria Division

Sharon Division

Tel Aviv Division

Jerusalem and South Division

See also
1949–50 Israeli League

References
1949-50 Bnei Yehuda 
100 Years of Football 1906–2006, Elisha Shohat (Israel), 2006

2
Israel
Liga Bet seasons